The 2012–13 Washington Huskies men's basketball team represented the University of Washington in the 2012–13 NCAA Division I men's basketball season.  This was head coach Lorenzo Romar's 11th season at Washington. The Huskies played their home games at Alaska Airlines Arena at Hec Edmundson Pavilion as members of the Pac-12 Conference. They finished the season 18–16, 9–9 in Pac-12 play to finish in a four-way tie for sixth place. They lost in the quarterfinals of the Pac-12 tournament to Oregon. They were invited to the 2013 NIT where they lost in the first round to BYU.

Departures

Recruits

Roster

Depth chart

Coaching staff

Schedule

|-
!colspan=9| Exhibition

|-
!colspan=9| Regular Season

|-
!colspan=9|2013 Pac-12 men's basketball tournament

|-
!colspan=9|2013 NIT

References

Washington Huskies
Washington Huskies men's basketball seasons
Washington
Washington
Washington